Micropleurotoma remota is a species of sea snail, a marine gastropod mollusk in the family Horaiclavidae.

Description

Distribution
This species occurs in the demersal zone of the Antarctic Ocean off Enderby Land, Antarctica. They live at a depth range of 193 - 3816 metres.

References

 Engl, W. (2012). Shells of Antarctica. Hackenheim: Conchbooks. 402 pp.
  Tucker, J.K. 2004 Catalog of recent and fossil turrids (Mollusca: Gastropoda). Zootaxa 682:1–1295

External links

remota
Gastropods described in 1958